Huyler Westervelt (October 1, 1869 – October 14, 1949) was an American pitcher in Major League Baseball (MLB). He played for the New York Giants in 1894.

Westervelt made his MLB debut on April 21, 1894, at the age of 24. He pitched in 23 games for the Giants that year, starting 18 of them and posting a record of 7–10 with a 5.04 earned run average. In 141 innings, he allowed 170 hits, 118 runs, and 79 earned runs while walking 76 batters and striking out 35. He also had 11 complete games, and his single shutout tied him for seventh most in the National League that season. At the plate, he hit .143 in 56 at-bats. He played his final MLB game on August 11, 1894.

Huyler was his mother's maiden name.

References

1869 births
1949 deaths
19th-century baseball players
New York Giants (NL) players
Derby-Shelton Angels players
Bradford Drillers players
Baseball players from New Jersey
Sportspeople from Bergen County, New Jersey
People from Tenafly, New Jersey
American people of Dutch descent